The Earl of Derby is a title that has been created thrice in British history. The first Earl may refer to:

 Robert de Ferrers, 1st Earl of Derby (1062–1139), English nobleman
 Henry of Grosmont, 1st Duke of Lancaster (c. 1310–1361), previously the Earl of Derby, English diplomat, politician, and soldier
 Thomas Stanley, 1st Earl of Derby (1435–1504), English nobleman and politician